This list refers to the Roman Catholic dioceses and ecclesiastical provinces in Germany and the organisational changes between 1821 and 1994. The territorial changes through and after the Napoleonic Wars determined much of today's diocesan boundaries. The territorial changes after the World Wars were followed by new diocesan boundaries in the 1920s and 1970s. Internal reorganisations took place in the 1930s, 1950s and early 1990s.

Fulda Conference of Bishops
This conference, preceding today's Conference of German Bishops, was established as Würzburg Conference of Bishops (only 1848) and as a regular institution named Fulda Conference since 1867. Renamed into German Bishops' Conference in 1965.

Ecclesiastical Province of Bamberg
This ecclesiastical province was founded in 1818.

 Archdiocese of Bamberg
 Diocese of Eichstätt
 Diocese of Speyer
 Diocese of Würzburg

Eastern German Ecclesiastical Province
This ecclesiastical province emerged in 1930 and was dissolved in 1972. Diocesan areas east of the Oder-Neiße line were under apostolic administration by Polish clergy since 1945. 
 Archdiocese of Breslau (Wrocław), since 1930, partially under Polish apostolic administration 1945–1972, then East German part dissected and the rest part of Polish episcopate
 Diocese of Berlin, est. 1930, partially under Polish apostolic administration 1945–1972, then Polish diocesan area dissected
 Diocese of Ermland (Warmia), since 1930, under Polish apostolic administration 1945–1972, then part of Polish episcopate
 Prelature of Schneidemühl (Piła), est. 1930, under Polish apostolic administration since 1945, dissolved in 1972

Ecclesiastical Province of Gnesen-Posen
This historically Polish ecclesiastical province was made part of the Fulda Conference in 1821 and disentangled in 1918/1919. to join the Episcopal Conference of Poland

 Archdiocese of Gnesen (Gniezno), 
 in personal union with the Diocese of Posen (Poznań)
Diocese of Culm (Chełmno), to Poland in 1920, 
Apostolic Administration of Tütz (Tuczno) - the parts of the abovementioned dioceses which remained with Germany 1920–1923, then disentangled to form together the Territorial Prelature of Schneidemühl (Piła), subordinate to Archdiocese of Breslau (Wrocław) 
Apostolic Administration of the Free City of Danzig - later the exempt Diocese of Danzig (Gdańsk)

Middle German Ecclesiastical Province
 Archdiocese of Paderborn, since 1930
 Diocese of Fulda, since 1930
 Diocese of Hildesheim, 1930–1994, then part of the Ecclesiastical Province of Hamburg

Ecclesiastical Province of Munich and Freising
This ecclesiastical province was founded in 1821.

 Archdiocese of Munich and Freising
 Diocese of Augsburg
 Diocese of Passau
 Diocese of Regensburg

Rhenish Ecclesiastical Province
This ecclesiastical province was founded in 802, it is also called ecclesiastical province of Cologne.

 Archdiocese of Cologne, newly Belgian Eupen-Malmedy dissected in 1921
 Diocese of Aachen, est. 1930 
 Diocese of Essen, est. 1958
 Diocese of Münster
 Diocese of Osnabrück, 1930–1994, then part of the Ecclesiastical Province of Hamburg
 Diocese of Paderborn, elevated to metropolia of the Middle German Ecclesiastical Province in 1930
 Diocese of Trier

Upper Rhenish Ecclesiastical Province
This ecclesiastical province was founded in 1821, it is also called ecclesiastical province of Freiburg im Breisgau.

 Archdiocese of Freiburg im Breisgau, est. 1821
 Diocese of Fulda, changed to Middle German Ecclesiastical Province in 1930
 Diocese of Limburg, changed to Rhenish Ecclesiastical Province in 1930
 Diocese of Mainz
 Diocese of Rottenburg-Stuttgart

Exempt dioceses
 Apostolic Vicariate of Anhalt, after territorial cessions to Hildesheim diocese in 1834 merged in the Diocese of Paderborn in 1921
 Diocese of Berlin, exempt 1972–1994, then elevated to metropolia of the Ecclesiastical Province of Berlin
 Diocese of Breslau (Wrocław), exempt 1821–1930, then elevated to metropolia of the Eastern German Ecclesiastical Province
 Prince-Episcopal Delegation for Brandenburg and Pomerania, elevated to Diocese of Berlin in 1930 
 Diocese of Ermland (Warmia), exempt 1566–1930, then part of the Eastern German Ecclesiastical Province
 Apostolic Administration of Görlitz, dissected from Breslau archdiocese in 1972, elevated to diocese in 1994 within the Ecclesiastical Province of Berlin
 Diocese of Hildesheim, exempt 1805–1930, then part of the Middle German Ecclesiastical Province
 Apostolic Prefecture of Meissen, elevated to Diocese of Meissen in 1921
 Diocese of Meissen, est. 1921, small diocesan area under Polish apostolic administration 1948–1972, then dissected, renamed Dresden-Meissen in 1980, part of the Ecclesiastical Province of Berlin since 1994
 Diocese of Metz, from France in 1871, to France in 1918/1919
 Apostolic Vicariate of the Nordic Missions, after territorial cessions renamed into Apostolic Vicariate of the Nordic Missions of Germany, merged in the Diocese of Osnabrück in 1930 
 Diocese of Osnabrück, part of the Rhenish Ecclesiastical Province since 1930
 Apostolic Vicariate of the Saxon Hereditary Lands, merged in Diocese of Meissen in 1921 
 Apostolic Prefecture of Schleswig-Holstein, dissected from Nordic Missions in 1868, newly Danish North Schleswig to Denmark apostolic vicariate in 1921, rest merged in Diocese of Osnabrück in 1930
 Diocese of Straßburg (Strasbourg), from France in 1871, to France in 1918/1919
 Apostolic Administration of Tütz, dissected from Gnesen-Posen and Culm in 1923, elevated to Schneidemühl prelature within Eastern German province in 1930

See also
 List of Roman Catholic dioceses in Germany

Germany, 1821
Catholic dioceses
Catholic dioceses